North Carolina's 1st Senate district is one of 50 districts in the North Carolina Senate. It has been represented by Republican Norman Sanderson since 2023.

Geography
Since 2023, the district has included all of Pasquotank, Perquimans, Chowan, Washington, Dare, Hyde, Carteret, and Pamlico counties. The district overlaps with the 1st, 5th, 13th, and 79th state house districts.

District officeholders since 1985

Election results

2022

2020

2018

2016

2014

2012

2010

2008

2006

2004

2002

2000

References

North Carolina Senate districts
Pasquotank County, North Carolina
Perquimans County, North Carolina
Chowan County, North Carolina
Washington County, North Carolina
Dare County, North Carolina
Hyde County, North Carolina
Carteret County, North Carolina
Pamlico County, North Carolina